This is a list of the awards and nominations received by the Indian actor, producer and director Aamir Khan. He has won 9 Filmfare Awards, out of 32 nominations, including 3 Best Actor awards for Raja Hindustani (1996), Lagaan (2001), and Dangal (2016), the Best Actor (Critics) award for Rang De Basanti (2006), the Best Film award for Lagaan, Taare Zameen Par (2007), and Dangal, and the Best Director award for Taare Zameen Par. He has also won four National Film Awards, as an actor in Qayamat Se Qayamat Tak and Raakh ,both in 1988 and as a producer of Lagaan(2001) , Madness in the Desert(2003) and as the director-producer of Taare Zameen Par(2007).

Overseas, Lagaan earned an Academy Award nomination for Best Foreign Language Film, and won various awards at international film festivals. This made it one of only three Indian films to receive an Oscar nomination, along with Mehboob Khan's Mother India (1957) and Mira Nair's Salaam Bombay! (1988). This also makes Aamir Khan one of the few Indian filmmakers to ever receive an Oscar nomination. Two more of his films were India's submissions to the Oscars, Taare Zameen Par and Peepli Live (2010), while Dhobi Ghat (2011) was longlisted for the BAFTA Award for Best Film Not in the English Language, though neither were nominated. In 2017, Dangal won him the inaugural Best Asian Film award at Australia's 7th AACTA Awards, as well as Movie of the Year and Top Foreign Actor from China's Douban Film Awards, and it is an award nominee for the 68th Berlin International Film Festival.

In addition, Khan has received honorary accolades, including the Government of India's Padma Shri in 2003 and Padma Bhushan in 2010, and an honorary doctorate by the Maulana Azad National Urdu University (MANUU) for his distinguished contributions to the Indian cinema and entertainment industry. In 2011, he accepted an invitation from the Berlin Film Festival to be a member of the jury, after having previously turned down their offer three times since 2008. In 2017, the Academy of Motion Picture Arts and Sciences invited Khan for membership, and he received an award for "National Treasure of India" from the Government of China.

Despite having won numerous awards and honours, Aamir Khan is known for refusing to attend, or accept awards from, Indian film award ceremonies. This has occasionally led to controversy, notably at the 2017 National Film Awards when the award committee responded by refusing to honour Khan with the Best Actor award for his performance in Dangal.

Civilian and honorary awards
 2003 – Padma Shri, the fourth highest civilian award in the Republic of India.
 2010 – Padma Bhushan, the third highest civilian award in the Republic of India.
 2009 – "Raj Kapoor Smriti Vishesh Gaurav Puraskar", an award received from the Government of Maharashtra in May 2009 for outstanding contribution to Indian cinema.
 2013 – Honorary Doctorate by Maulana Azad National Urdu University (MANUU) for his distinguished contribution to the Indian cinema and entertainment industry.
 2017 – "National Treasure of India", an award received from the Government of China in April 2017.

Indian film awards

Filmfare Awards
The Filmfare Awards are presented annually by The Times Group to honour both artistic and technical excellence of professionals in the Hindi language film industry of India. The Filmfare ceremony is one of the oldest film events in India, established in 1954.
The Filmfare Awards have been often referred to as the Hindi film industry's equivalent to the Academy Awards.

National Film Awards 
The National Film Awards is one of the most prominent film award ceremonies in India. Established in 1954, it is administered by the International Film Festival of India and the Indian government's Directorate of Film Festivals. The awards are presented by the President of India. Due to their national scale, they are considered to be Indian cinema's equivalent to the Academy Awards.

Aamir Khan
Lists of awards received by Indian actor

IIFA Awards

Producers Guild Film Awards

Screen Awards 
 Won

 Best Actor  Raja Hindustani
 Best Film  Lagaan
 Best Director  Taare Zameen Par
 Best Supporting Actor  Taare Zameen Par
 Best Film  Dangal
 Star Plus Nayi Soch Award  Dangal

Nominated

 2008 – Best Film  Taare Zameen Par
 2010 – Best Actor  3 Idiots
 2014 – Best Actor  Dhoom 3
 2014 – Best Actor (Popular)  Dhoom 3
 2015 – Best Actor  PK

Gollapudi Srinivas Award

Zee Cine Awards

Bengal Film Journalists' Association Awards

Bollywood Movie Awards

BIG Star Entertainment Awards
Winner
 2010 – BIG Star – Film Actor of Decade (Male)

International Film Awards

AACTA Awards

Douban Film Awards

European Film Awards

Film festivals

Other awards
Winner
 2001 – Bollywood People's Choice Awards: Best Actor for Lagaan: Once Upon a Time in India
 2008 – Planet Bollywood People's Choice Awards: Best Director for Taare Zameen Par.
 2008 – Planet Bollywood People's Choice Awards: Best Supporting Actor for Taare Zameen Par.
 2008 – V. Shantaram Awards: Best Film Gold Award for Taare Zameen Par.
 2008 – V. Shantaram Awards: Best Director Silver Award for Taare Zameen Par.
 2010 – Annual Central European Bollywood Award: Best Actor for 3 Idiots.
 2010 – Creative Entrepreneur of the Year Award at NDTV Profit Business Leadership Awards. 
 2010 – Cinematic Icon Award by GQ India.
 2013 – Inaugural America Abroad Media Award for Satyamev Jayate.
 2014 – ETC Bollywood Business Award: Highest Grossing Actor (male) Award for Dhoom 3.
 2014 – ETC Bollywood Business Award: Most Profitable Actor Award for Dhoom 3.
 2014 – Star Box Office India Award: Actor Of The Year(Male) for Dhoom 3.
 2015 – ETC Bollywood Business Award: Highest Grossing Actor (male) Award for PK.
 2017 – Creative Maverick Award by GQ India.

Honours and recognitions
 In March 2001, he was ranked as the 3rd Most Powerful Indian Film Star by Forbes.
 In December 2001, he was named "Man of the Year" by Bombay Times.
 In 2002, he was a member of the jury of the Locarno film festival.
 In April 2008, he received a "Special Award" from Master Dinanath Mangeshkar Smruti Pratisthan for his services to Indian cinema.
 In January 2009, he received "Indian of The Year in Cinema" Award by NDTV
 In January 2009, he received the "Indian of the Year in Entertainment" Award from CNN-IBN.
 In August 2012, he featured on the cover page of the TIME.
 In April 2013, he was among TIME magazine's 100 Most Influential People in the World List.
 In April 2017, he received a "Special Award" from Master Dinanath Mangeshkar Smruti Pratisthan for the recognition for the success of his film Dangal.
 In June 2017, he was included in Reputation Poll's inaugural "100 Most Reputable People on Earth" list.
 In June 2017, the Academy of Motion Picture Arts and Sciences invited Khan for membership.

See also
List of accolades received by Lagaan
List of accolades received by Taare Zameen Par
List of accolades received by 3 Idiots

Notes

References

Aamir Khan
Lists of awards received by Indian actor
|}